Anton Chekhov was a Russian playwright and short-story writer who is considered to be among the greatest writers of short fiction in history. He wrote hundreds of short stories, one novel, and seven full-length plays.

Plays

Four-act plays
Untitled Play (Пьеса без названия, discovered 19 years after the author's death in manuscript form with title page missing; most commonly known as Platonov in English; 1878)—adapted in English by Michael Frayn as Wild Honey (1984)
Ivanov (Иванов, 1887)—a play in four acts
The Wood Demon (Леший, 1889)—a comedy in four acts; eight years after the play was published Chekhov returned to the work and extensively revised it into Uncle Vanya (see below)
The Seagull (Чайка, 1896)—a comedy in four acts
Uncle Vanya (Дядя Ваня, 1897)—scenes from country life in four acts; based on The Wood Demon
Three Sisters (Три сестры, 1901)—a drama in four acts
The Cherry Orchard (Вишнёвый сад, 1904)—a comedy in four acts

One-act plays
On the High Road (На большой дороге, 1884)—a dramatic study in one act
On the Harmful Effects of Tobacco (О вреде табака; 1886, 1902)—a monologue in one act
Swansong (Лебединая песня, 1887)—a dramatic study in one act
The Bear or The Boor (Медведь: Шутка в одном действии, 1888)—a farce in one act
A Marriage Proposal (Предложение, c. 1889)—a farce in one act
A Tragedian in Spite of Himself or A Reluctant Tragic Hero (Трагик поневоле, 1889)—a farce in one act
The Wedding (Свадьба, 1889)—a play in one act
Tatiana Repina (Татьяна Репина, 1889)—a drama in one act
The Night before the Trial (Ночь перед судом, the 1890s)—a play in one act; sometimes considered unfinished
The Festivities or The Anniversary (Юбилей, 1891)—a farce in one act

Novel 
The Shooting Party (Драма на охоте, 1884)

Novellas 
The Unnecessary Victory (Ненужная победа, 1882)
The Steppe (Степь, 1888)
The Duel (Дуэль, 1891)
The Story of an Unknown Man (Рассказ неизвестного человека, 1893)
Three Years (Три года, 1895)
My Life (Моя жизнь, 1896)

Novelettes 
Late-Blooming Flowers (Цветы запоздалые, 1882)
A Living Chattel (Живой товар, 1882)
Lights (Огни, 1888)
The Party (Именины, 1888) 
A Dreary Story (Скучная история, 1889)
Ward No. 6 (Палата No. 6, 1892)
The Wife (Жена, 1892)
The Black Monk (Чёрный монах, 1894)
A Woman's Kingdom (Бабье царство, 1894)
Murder (Убийство, 1895)
Peasants (Мужики, 1897)
In the Ravine (В овраге, 1900)

Short-story collections 

Collections of his stories that Chekhov prepared and published, or, in the case of The Prank, attempted to publish.

The Prank (Шалость, 1882)

The Tales of Melpomene (Сказки Мельпомены, 1884)

Motley Stories (Пёстрые рассказы, 1886)

In the Twilight (В сумерках, 1887)

Innocent Speeches (Невинные речи, 1887)

Stories (Рассказы, 1888)

Children (Детвора, 1889)

Gloomy People (Хмурые люди, 1890)

Ward No. 6 (Палата № 6, 1893)

Novellas and Stories (Повести и рассказы, 1894)

Peasants and My Life (Мужики и Моя жизнь, 1897)

The Little Trilogy (Маленькая трилогия, 1898)

Stories (Рассказы, 1901)

Short stories 
Chekhov wrote 574 short stories including unfinished short stories. The following is a partial list.

Nonfiction 

A Journey to Sakhalin (1895), including:
Sakhalin Island (1891–1895)
Across Siberia

Letters
(In English translation.)
Letters of Anton Tchehov to His Family and Friends: With a Biographical Sketch. Translated by Constance Garnett. New York. 1920. Internet Archive on-line edition.
Letters on the Short Story, the Drama, and Other Literary Topics, by Anton Chekhov. Selected and Edited by Louis S. Friedland. London. 1924.
The Letters of Anton Pavolvitch Tchekhov to Olga Leonardovna Knipper. Translated from the Russian by Constance Garnett. New York.
The Life and Letters of Anton Tchekov. Translated and Edited by S.S. Koteliansky and Philip Tomlinson. New York. 1925.
The Personal Papers of Anton Chekhov. Introduction by Matthew Josephson. New York. 1948.
The Selected Letters of Anton Chekhov. Edited by Lillian Hellman and translated by Sidonie Lederer. New York. 1955. .
DEAR WRITER, DEAR ACTRESS: The Love Letters of Anton Chekhov and Olga Knipper. Ecco, 1997, .
Anton Chekhov's Life and Thought: Selected Letters and Commentary. Translated by Simon Karlinsky, Michael Henry Heim, Northwestern University Press, 1997, .
A Life in Letters. Translated by Rosamund Bartlett, Anthony Phillips. Penguin Books, 2004. .

Notebooks
Note-Book of Anton Chekhov. Translated by S. S. Koteliansky, Leonard Woolf, New York: B. W. Huebsch, 1921. Internet Archive on-line edition.

References 

Entirely in Russian 
The Undiscovered Chekhov: Fifty-One Newly Translated Stories, translated by Peter Constantine, foreword by Spalding Gray, UK (Duckbacks) edition, 2002: .  NB: This collection seems to expand with each new edition
The Unknown Chekhov: Stories and Other Writings Hitherto Unpublished, translated by Avrahm Yarmolinsky, 1954
The Prank: The Best of Young Chekhov, translated by Maria Bloshteyn, New York (NYRB) edition, 2015:

External links 

 
 
 Five short stories by Chekhov adapted for the stage
 Bringing early Chekhov to an English-speaking readership
 
 Study resource for "The Lady with the Dog" Retrieved 17 February 2007.

Audio 
 55 + Stories Internet Archive Creative Commons and Public Domain
 The Little Trilogy Internet Archive Creative Commons and Public Domain
 Additional Stories from LibriVox See More Chekhov Stories

 
Bibliographies by writer
Bibliographies of Russian writers
Dramatist and playwright bibliographies